Alexander Grass (August 3, 1927 – August 27, 2009) was an American businessman and lawyer who founded Rite Aid, one of the United States' largest drugstore chains.

Early life
Grass was born in Scranton, Pennsylvania, to Jewish parents, Louis and Rose Grass. His father, a businessman whom Grass described in 2002 as "relatively successful", died during the Great Depression when Grass was 9 years old, leaving the family with little income. Grass' family relocated from Scranton to Miami Beach, Florida in 1936 after his father's death. Grass worked a number of small jobs while living in Florida.  He eventually obtained a law degree from the University of Florida Law School in 1949 using the G.I. Bill.

He met his wife, Lois Lehrman, while in Florida and the couple married six months later.

Rite Aid

Grass moved back to Pennsylvania to pursue a legal career in tax law with the Internal Revenue Service and other government agencies. He took a position with the Pennsylvania state Department of Revenue.

Grass became a businessman during the early 1950s partially due to his marriage into his wife's Harrisburg, Pennsylvania based Lehrman family. He began working for his father-in-law's, Lehrman & Sons, wholesale grocery distribution company along with his brother-in-law Lewis Lehrman in 1951.

Grass saw several opportunities for retail opportunities in the 1960s. While working for the distribution company, Grass noticed that there seemed to be a lack of competitively priced health and beauty stores in Pennsylvania. More importantly, in the early 1960s the United States Supreme Court citing the Robinson–Patman Act that manufacturers could not dictate minimum prices for retailers.

Grass suddenly saw an opportunity in the retail sector, thanks to the Supreme Court ruling and lack of competing drugstores. He decided to open a store in downtown Scranton, which he called the Thrif D Discount Center, in 1962. The store would be the first of the chain which would become Rite Aid. He quickly expanded the store, opening other locations in Wilkes-Barre, Hazleton and Lancaster, as well as a second location in Scranton.

By 1968, the company, which had more than 50 stores at the time, had changed its name to Rite Aid. Rite Aid's initial public offering at  $25 a share on the New York Stock Exchange earned the Grass family $8.75 million. Rite Aid purchased a rival chain, the Daw Drug Company, which was based in Rochester, New York, in 1969, which doubled the company's size and gave Rite Aid a pharmacy business for the first time.

By the middle of the 1990s, Grass had grown Rite Aid drugstores into an important regional chain. Grass retired as the company's chairman and chief executive in March 1995. That year, Rite Aid had the most stores of any drugstore in the country and was the nation's number two drugstore in terms of revenue.

Grass' son, Martin Grass, took over the company from his father in 1995. Rite Aid declined as a chain and a brand as Martin Grass sought to expand the company. Martin Grass was fired by the company in 1999, after he was implicated in an $1.6 billion accounting scandal that nearly destroyed Rite Aid, just four years after his father had retired. Martin Grass was convicted of overstating Rite Aid's earnings during the 1990s and sentenced to eight years in federal prison. He is still incarcerated as of 2009. Other Rite Aid executives were also convicted in the scandal.

While still at Rite Aid, former Scranton Mayor James B. McNulty approached Grass about developing an eyesore and vacant lot at the corner of North Washington Avenue and Spruce Street at Courthouse Square in downtown Scranton, just blocks from the original "Thrif D Discount Center." Grass accepted McNulty's offer to develop the long vacant site. The four-story Rite Aid office building, with a Rite Aid store on the first floor was constructed at the site. A plaque on the side of the Rite Aid Building commemorates Grass and his establishment of Rite Aid in Scranton.

Later life
Alex Grass became involved in philanthropy and other business interests following his departure from Rite Aid. For numerous years he headed the board of governors of the Hebrew University of Jerusalem that bestowed him with the National Scopus Award. The Grass Center for Drug Design and Synthesis of Novel Therapeutics was founded at the university in 1993.

He served as the longtime director of the National Association of Chain Drug Stores.

In 1999, Grass and his son, Roger Grass, purchased the Fleer/SkyBox sports trading card company.  The company closed and was sold in 2005.

Grass divorced his first wife, Lois Lehrman. His second wife, Louise, died in 2007. Grass had four children during his lifetime.

Grass donated $1.5 million to establish the Alex Grass School of Business Leadership at Harrisburg Area Community College. The PinnacleHealth's (now called UPMC Central PA) Harrisburg Hospital named a $14.5 million building after Grass, who was one of its benefactors.

Grass donated $1.5 million to the University of Florida to establish chair for its Center for Jewish Studies and construct a new law school building.

Death
Alex Grass died at his home in Harrisburg, Pennsylvania, on August 27, 2009, after a ten-year-long battle with lung cancer.

Grass' funeral was held at Temple Ohev Sholom in Harrisburg.  He was buried in Mount Moriah Cemetery in Lower Paxton Township, Pennsylvania.

References

External links
[http://obits.pennlive.com/obituaries/pennlive/obituary.aspx?n=alexander-grass&pid=132036962 Alexander Grass Death Notice at The Patriot-News (PennLive.com)
Alex Grass dies at 82 at The Los Angeles Times (LA Times.com)

Rite Aid
1927 births
2009 deaths
20th-century American businesspeople
Pennsylvania lawyers
Businesspeople from Scranton, Pennsylvania
People from Harrisburg, Pennsylvania
University of Florida alumni
Jewish American philanthropists
Deaths from lung cancer in Pennsylvania
American businesspeople convicted of crimes
20th-century American philanthropists
Burials in Pennsylvania
20th-century American lawyers
20th-century American Jews
21st-century American Jews